Vichadero is a small village in the Rivera Department of northeastern Uruguay.

Geography
The village is located on Route 6, and its junction with Route 27.

History
On 4 September 1950, it was declared a "Pueblo" (village) by the Act of Ley Nº 11.484, and then on 3 May 1984 its status was elevated to "Villa" (town) by the Act of Ley Nº 15.538.

An important feature of this small town is its airport.

Population
In 2011 Vichadero had a population of 3,698.
 
Source: Instituto Nacional de Estadística de Uruguay

Places of worship
La Iglesia de Jesucristo de Los Santos de Los Últimos Días, Figueroa Vichadero 
 Parish Church of Mary Help of Christians (Roman Catholic)

Notable people
 Jonathan Álvez, football striker
 Diego Casas, football striker

References

External links
INE map of Vichadero
Rivera / Vichadero  (El Observador)
Intendencia Departamental de Rivera / Vichadero

Populated places in the Rivera Department